Luhansk Oblast is the easternmost oblast (province) of Ukraine. The oblast uses a cobalt flag charged with its coat of arms.

The flag consists of a cobalt background with a side ratio of 1:1.5 (100 X 165 cm). In the top-left corner of the flag there is a circle, with a radius of 20 cm. The circle's center is 49 cm from the left border of the flag and 39 cm from the top border. Seventeen yellow and 14 white smaller stars, 4 cm in size, surround it. The Luhansk Oblast's small coat of arms is located within the circle.

References

See also 

 Coat of arms of Luhansk Oblast
 Flag of Luhansk
 Flags used in Russian-controlled areas of Ukraine, for the flag used in areas of Luhansk Oblast occupied by Russia

  Flags of the World website - Luhans'ka oblast'

Flags of Ukraine
Flag
Flags displaying animals
Flags introduced in 1998